Wang Do may refer to:

Duke Joseon (died 1099), Munjong of Goryeo's son
Chungsuk of Goryeo (1294–1339), Goryeo king